Zagłębie Wałbrzych is a Polish multisports club in the south-western city of Wałbrzych. The club, based in the Biały Kamień neighbourhood, is the most famous for its football team, which competed in the Polish top division in the past.

History
The club was founded in 1945. Its founders were Polish emigres returning from France and Belgium, who named the club Thorez, after Maurice Thorez, a French communist leader. The name was disliked by most fans and was changed in 1968 into Zagłębie, which means coal basin in Polish, as Wałbrzych was an important center of mining.

In 1968, Zagłębie Wałbrzych won promotion to the Ekstraklasa, and in the 1970–71 season, it finished in the 3rd spot, after Górnik Zabrze and Legia Warsaw. Zagłębie participated in the games of the UEFA Cup, advancing to the second round. In the first round, it beat Czechoslovakian team FK Teplice (1-0, 3-2), in the second round it lost to Romanian side UT Arad (1-1, 1-2). Team's most famous player is goalkeeper Marian Szeja, participant of the 1972 Olympic Games.

After the 1973–74 season, Zagłębie was relegated from the top division and has never returned. A difficult financial situation of sports clubs in Wałbrzych meant that in the early 1990s the club merged with fierce rivals Górnik Wałbrzych much to the shock of both sets of fans after over 40 years of rivalry. The new merged club then became "KP Wałbrzych", then "KP Górnik/Zagłębie Wałbrzych". Matches were played at Zagłębie's stadium but eventually the Zagłębie part was dropped from the name and the club de facto ceased to exist.

On 6 April 2006 the "Stowarzyszenie GKS Zagłębie Wałbrzych", was created, reactivating the football section of the club. From 2008, the team participates in the regional games of Lower Silesia.

In 2019, a women's football section was founded.

Honours
 2x 3rd place in I liga: 1970/1971, 1970/1971
 2x Polish Cup Quarter-finals: 1962/63, 1992/93
 1/16th of UEFA Cup: 1971/72

European record

Notable players
Marian Szeja, Joachim Stachuła and Stanisław Paździor have all played in the Poland national football team.

References

External links

 
Sports clubs established in 1945
Association football clubs established in 1945
1945 establishments in Poland
Multi-sport clubs in Poland
Wałbrzych
Sport in Lower Silesian Voivodeship
Mining association football clubs in Poland